Nuoro ( or less correctly) is a city and comune (municipality) in central-eastern Sardinia, Italy, situated on the slopes of the Monte Ortobene. It is the capital of the province of Nuoro. With a population of 36,347 (2011), it is the sixth-largest city in Sardinia.

Birthplace of several renowned artists, including writers, poets, painters, sculptors, Nuoro hosts some of the most important museums in Sardinia. It is considered an important cultural center of the region and it has been referred to as the "Sardinian Athens". Nuoro is the hometown of Grazia Deledda, the only Italian woman to win (1926) the Nobel Prize in Literature.

History 

The earliest traces of human settlement in the Nuoro area (called " the Nuorese") are the so-called Domus de janas, rock-cut tombs dated at the third millennium BC. However, fragments of ceramics of the Ozieri culture have also been discovered and dated at c. 3500 BC.

The Nuorese was a centre of the Nuragic civilization (which developed in Sardinia from c. 1500 BC to c. 250 BC), as attested by more than 30 Nuragic sites, such has the village discovered in the countryside of Tanca Manna, just outside Nuoro, which was made of about 800 huts.

The Nuorese was crossed by a Roman road which connected Karalis (Cagliari) to Ulbia (Olbia). The legacy of the Roman colonization can especially be found in the variety of the Sardinian language which is still spoken today in Nuoro: Nuorese Sardinian is considered the most conservative dialect of Sardinian, which is in turn the most conservative Romance language.

After the fall of the Western Roman Empire, Sardinia was held first by the Vandals and then by the Byzantines. According to the letters of Pope Gregory I, a Romanized and Christianized culture (that of the provinciales) co-existed with several Pagan cultures (those of the Gens Barbaricina, i.e. "Barbarian People") mainly located in the island's interior. As the Byzantine control waned, the Judicates appeared. A small village known as Nugor appears on some medieval doeuments of XI-XIII centuries. In the two following centuries it grew to more than 1000 inhabitants. Nuoro remained a town of average importance under the Aragonese and Spanish domination of Sardinia, until famine and plague struck it in the late 17th century.

After the annexation to the Kingdom of Sardinia, the town became the administrative center of the area, obtaining the title of city in 1836.

Culture

ISRE

Since 1972 in Nuoro is active the Istituto superiore regionale etnografico (ISRE), which is an institution that promotes  the study and documentation of the social and cultural life of Sardinia in its traditional manifestations and its transformations. In fact, in addition to managing museums and libraries, it organizes national and international events, including:
the Sardinia International Ethnographic Film Festival (SIEFF) and the Festival Biennale Italiano dell’Etnografia (ETNU) (Italian Biennial Festival of Ethnography).

Museums 
 Sardinian Ethnographic Museum (Museo Etnografico Sardo).
 Grazia Deledda's Museum (Museo Deleddiano).
 M.A.N., Museo d’Arte Provincia di Nuoro (Modern Art Museum of the Nuoro Province).
 National Archaeological Museum of Nuoro (Museo Archeologico Nazionale di Nuoro).
 Museo Ciusa, Museum dedicated to Francesco Ciusa and other artists
 Spazio Ilisso

Monuments and historical sites 

 Cathedral of Our Lady of the Snows	
 Piazza Sebastiano Satta
 Chiesa di Nostra Signora delle Grazie	
 Chiesa della Solitudine
 The Redeemer's statue, Monte Ortobene, the 7 meters tall Vincenzo Gerace's bronze statue installed 29 August 1901.
 Nuraghe Ugolio 
 Chiesa di San Carlo, church built in the 17th century containing a copy of Francesco Ciusa's masterpiece La madre dell'ucciso. 
 Sas Birghines, Domus de Janas located in Monte Ortobene
 Sanctuary Madonna of Montenero, Monte Ortobene

Language 
Along with Italian, the traditional language spoken in Nuoro is Sardinian, in its Logudorese-Nuorese variety.

Food 
Nuoro is home to the world's rarest pasta, su filindeu. The name in Sardinian language means "the threads (or wool) of God" and is made exclusively by the women of a single family in the town, with the recipe being passed down through generations.

Cultural international events
 Sardinia International Ethnographic Film Festival

Government

Transport

Road
Nuoro is served by the SS 131 DCN (Olbia-Abbasanta), the SS 129 (Orosei-Macomer), and the SS 389 (Monti-Lanusei).

Bus
ARST, Azienda Regionale Sarda Trasporti provide regular connections to Cagliari, Sassari, Olbia, and to several minor centres in the province and the region.

Other private operators (including Deplano Autolinee, Turmotravel, Redentours) connects Nuoro to various cities and airports in the island.

Rail
Nuoro is connected by train to Macomer via Ferrovie della Sardegna.

Local transportation
ATP Nuoro's bus system provides service within the city.

Notable people 

 Sebastiano Satta (1867–1914), poet, lawyer
 Grazia Deledda (1871–1936), writer, winner Nobel Prize
 Francesco Ciusa (1883–1949), sculptor, winner of the Venice Biennale
 Adelasia Cocco (1885–1983), Health Officer in Nuoro, possibly the first female doctor in Italy
 Attilio Deffenu (1890–1918), trade unionist
 Salvatore Satta (1902–1975), jurist, writer
 Sebastiano Mannironi (born 1930), athlete. Olympic games medal winner. 
 Franco Oppo (born 1935), composer
 Marcello Fois (born 1960), writer
 Flavio Manzoni (born 1967), car designer
 Gianfranco Zola (born 1966), footballer
 Salvatore Sirigu (born 1987), footballer

Twin towns 

  Corte, France
  Tolmezzo, Italy

Notes

References

External links 

 Official Website 
 Official (Municipality) Tourism Website 
 Official (Region) Tourism Website

 
Cities and towns in Sardinia